Sodium channel protein type 7 subunit alpha is a protein that in humans is encoded by the SCN7A gene on the chromosome specifically located at 2q21-23 chromosome site.
This is one of 10 Sodium channel types, and is expressed in the heart, the uterus and in glial cells. Its sequence identity is 48, and it is the only sodium channel known to be completely un-blockable by tetrodotoxin (TTX).

See also 
 Sodium channel
Scn7a is the name of the gene that encodes to a membrane protein, in particular a Sodium Channel Nax (also known as NaG, Nav2.1, etc.) It belongs to the family of voltage-gated sodium channels, though is not activated by changes in the membrane's voltage unlike other members in the family, namely (Nav1.1 to Nav1.9); it activates by changes in the extracellular concentration of sodium [~150 mM].

References

Further reading

External links 
 

Sodium channels